The 2022 Papua New Guinea Tri-Nation Series was the 11th round of the 2019–2023 ICC Cricket World Cup League 2 cricket tournament, which was played in the United Arab Emirates in April 2022. Originally scheduled to take place in Papua New Guinea, it was moved to the UAE due to travel restrictions. It was a tri-nation series between Oman, Papua New Guinea and the Scotland cricket teams, with the matches played as One Day International (ODI) fixtures. The ICC Cricket World Cup League 2 formed part of the qualification pathway to the 2023 Cricket World Cup.

Originally, the matches were due to be played in Papua New Guinea in April 2021. However, on 12 February 2021, the series was postponed due to the COVID-19 pandemic.

Squads

Finlay McCreath was also named in Scotland's squad as a travelling reserve player.

Fixtures

1st ODI

2nd ODI

3rd ODI

4th ODI

5th ODI

6th ODI

Notes

References

External links
 Series home at ESPN Cricinfo

2022 in Omani cricket
2022 in Papua New Guinean cricket
2022 in Scottish cricket
International cricket competitions in 2021–22
Papua New Guinea (April)
Papua New Guinea (April)
Papua New Guinea Tri-Nation Series